Mariya Yalova (born 15 November 1981) is a Kazakhstani women's football forward who last played for Kubanochka in the Russian Championship. She has also played for Temir Zholy, CSHVSM and BIIK Kazygurt in the Kazakhstani Championship and for Universitet Vitebsk in the Belarusian Premier League.

External links 
 

1981 births
Living people
Kazakhstani women's footballers
Kazakhstan women's international footballers
Expatriate women's footballers in Russia
Kazakhstani expatriate footballers
Kazakhstani expatriate sportspeople in Russia
Women's association football forwards
BIIK Kazygurt players
Kubanochka Krasnodar players
CSHVSM-Kairat players
Universitet Vitebsk players